Jade Benham is an Australian politician who is the current member for the district of Mildura in the Victorian Legislative Assembly. She is a member of the Nationals and was elected in the 2022 state election, after defeating incumbent MLA Ali Cupper.

Benham was born in Swan Hill and completed her secondary education at Swan Hill Secondary College.

She was elected mayor of Swan Hill Rural City Council in November 2021 and took leave of absence from that position in July 2022 to stand in the Victorian state election.

Personal life 
According to Jade's parliamentary register of interests, she is a landlord and owns a rental property in Swan Hill.

References 

Year of birth missing (living people)
Living people
Members of the Victorian Legislative Assembly
21st-century Australian women politicians
National Party of Australia members of the Parliament of Victoria
21st-century Australian politicians
Women members of the Victorian Legislative Assembly
Mayors of places in Victoria (Australia)
People from Swan Hill